Tiberius Claudius Marcus Appius Atilius Bradua Regillus Atticus, otherwise known as Atticus Bradua   (around 145-after 209) was a Roman politician of Athenian and Italian descent who was consul ordinarius in 185 AD.

Ancestry and Family
Atticus Bradua born to a wealthy family of consular rank.  He was the second son of the Greek Senator and Sophist Herodes Atticus and the Roman Aspasia Annia Regilla, a very influential woman. 

The paternal grandparents of Atticus Bradua were the Senator Tiberius Claudius Atticus Herodes and the wealthy heiress Vibullia Alcia Agrippina, while his maternal grandparents were the consul Appius Annius Trebonius Gallus and Atilia Caucidia Tertulla. His paternal uncle was Tiberius Claudius Atticus Herodianus, while his paternal aunt was Claudia Tisamenis. The maternal uncle of Atticus Bradua was Appius Annius Atilius Bradua who served as an ordinary consul in 160.

Through his maternal grandfather, Atticus Bradua was a relative to the Empress Faustina the Elder, wife of Antoninus Pius. Faustina the Elder was the mother of Empress Faustina the Younger and aunt of Marcus Aurelius.

Life
While the place of birth of Atticus Bradua is not known, he was raised in Greece. As a child, he couldn't learn how to read. His father purchased twenty-four slave boys to whom he gave names beginning with the letters of the alphabet to help Atticus Bradua learn his letters. According to an inscription, there is a possibility that Atticus Bradua was sent to Sparta by his father to become an ephebe (citizen-cadet) and if so, it left no long-lasting influence on him. 

The students and freedmen of Herodes Atticus were clamoring for his attention and benefactions. The students and freedmen of his father were jealous of the family of Herodes Atticus, and because of his learning disability they may have slandered him. 

The parents of Atticus Bradua erected a great outdoor nymphaeum (a monumental fountain) at Olympia, Greece. The monumental fountain features statues and honors members of the ruling imperial family, including members of his family and relatives of his parents. Among the statues is a bust of Atticus Bradua which is on display at the Archaeological Museum of Olympia. 

Atticus Bradua was about 15 years old when his mother died. His maternal uncle claimed that his father murdered her, which may have caused an irreparable rift between father and son. Herodes Atticus saw Atticus Bradua as a disappointment. Herodes Atticus outlived his family and Atticus Bradua became his only surviving child, but relations between the two continued to deteriorate. When Herodes Atticus died in 177, he left nothing to Atticus Bradua. The Athenians considered Herodes Atticus's treatment towards Atticus Bradua inhumane.

Wealth, political career and benefactions
After the death of his mother, Atticus Bradua inherited the estate that his mother owned with his father on the Appian Way. Atticus Bradua was considered by others as more competent than Herodes Atticus, probably due to his status and wealth. At some point during the reign of Antoninus Pius (138–161), the Emperor promoted Atticus Bradua to Patrician rank. 

Atticus Bradua served as an ordinary consul in 185  and became an Archon of Athens in 187/188. Sometime after his consulship, he served as Proconsul of a Roman Province. 

Atticus Bradua followed in the footsteps of his parents as a benefactor, but not on such a lavish scale, as his fortune was much smaller than his father's. He contributed a gift to Piraeus which was commemorated and in 209 the Athenian Boule honored Atticus Bradua as Euergetes or Herald. 

An inscription found on a grey limestone dated after 185 at the Curia at Leptis Magna (the capital of the Africa Province) is possibly dedicated to Atticus Bradua. This inscription shows that Atticus Bradua may have served as a Proconsul of Africa, could have served as a local patron and may have changed his name to honor the memory of his family, mother and maternal ancestry, and to express discontent with his father. The inscription reads:

To Marcus Atilius Metilius Bradua Caucidius Tertullus Claudius Atticus Vibullius Pollio Gauidius Latiaris Atrius Bassus, proconsul; Decimus Junius Crescens, Decimus Junius Galba, Quintus Calpurnius Capito, Lucius Plautius Octavianus to their patron.

References

Sources
 Graindor, P., Un milliardaire antique, Ayers Company Publishers, 1979
 Wilson, N.G., Encyclopedia of Ancient Greece, Routledge, 2006
 Pomeroy, S.B., The murder of Regilla: a case of domestic violence in antiquity, Harvard University Press, 2007
 https://web.archive.org/web/20110716083759/http://www.sleepinbuff.com/13history.pdf 

2nd-century Athenians
2nd-century Romans
3rd-century Greek people
3rd-century Romans
140s births

3rd-century deaths
Year of birth uncertain
Ancient Athenians
Imperial Roman consuls
Ancient Roman governors
People from Attica
Roman Athens
Atilii
Claudii
Eponymous archons